Hibberts (or Hibbert), was launched in 1784 on the Thames as a West Indiaman. The first two times that French forces captured her the Royal Navy recaptured her. The second of these incidents, in 1804, gave rise to three court cases – an appeal to the Vice admiralty court at Halifax, Nova Scotia, a maritime insurance case that reached the United States Supreme Court, and one in London dealing with the labor contracts covering seamen. Between these two captures and recaptures, in 1803 Hibberts served briefly as an armed merchant ship under the command of a Royal Navy officer. The French captured her for the third and final time in 1811. Hibberts was the model for the sculpture that adorned the western gate of the West India Docks, giving it the name "Hibbert Gate".

Career
Hibberts first appeared in Lloyd's Register (LR) in 1784, with Jn. Boyd, master, Hibberts & Co., owners, and trade London–Jamaica.

In September 1795 a French squadron captured Hibberts, Chisholm, master, as she was sailing from Jamaica to London, but  recaptured her. As she was returning to England, Hibberts ran aground at Scattery Island, Limerick ; she was gotten off and returned to London.

On 12 July 1800, Captain John Frederick Butcher acquired a letter of marque.

Two sources suggest that Hibberts might have engaged in whaling in 1802, but have no further supporting evidence. At the time she was valued at £7,500.

Instead, in 1802, Hibberts served as an armed ship for the Royal Navy, with a naval officer in command. She and several other transports arrived at Plymouth to take onboard the 29th Regiment of Foot. On 26 July the "Hibberts armed ship", under the command of Lieutenant Donovan, left Plymouth Sound for Halifax, Nova Scotia. 

In 1804, the French privateer Restant captured Hibberts as she was returning from Honduras with a cargo of mahogany and took her into Havana. In Havana a local court condemned her in prize. A merchant took possession and sailed her for New York. He insured her cargo with a United States insurance company.

As Hibberts was sailing from Havana to New York,  recaptured her. This incident gave rise to a case in the Vice admiralty court in Halifax, that restored her to her British owners. A summary of the case stated:

The recapture also gave rise to a case that reached the U.S. Supreme Court, involving insurance on the vessel and cargo, in which the plaintiffs won against the insurance company. The court ruled that because the vessel could be considered a total loss, the policy holder was entitle to collect under the policy.

Lastly, when Hibberts reached London after having been recaptured, there was a case in which it was found that her crew had left her without having been discharged. Hurry and Co. had hired a crew in Halifax to bring her back to London. When she arrived above the West Indies Docks, the crew left her, but without acquiring certificates of discharge. Unfortunately for them a customs officer ordered her to be moved to the West Indian Docks because some of her cargo was from the West Indies. The owners had to have her moved. The court ruled that the crew had not deserted her (in which they would have been mulcted of all pay), but that the crew would be mulcted of one month's pay in favour of the Greenwich Hospital. The case was cited in another case.

Fate
A French privateer succeeded in capturing Hibberts a third and last time, in 1811, and took her into Dunkirk.

The Hibbert Gate
George Hibbert was one of the directors of the West India Docks, completed in 1802.  Hibberts was the model for the sculpture that adorned the western gate, leading to it being known as the "Hibbert Gate". The gate was torn down in 1932. A replica of the original gate has since been erected on the Canary Wharf site in 2000 as a memorial for the docks.

Poplar
The Hibberts is the ship commemorated on the civic seal of the London Borough of Poplar

Notes

Citations

References

External links
 

1784 ships
Age of Sail merchant ships of England
Hired armed vessels of the Royal Navy
Captured ships
Maritime incidents in 1795